Epithet Erased is an American animated action-comedy web-series created by Brendan Blaber. It premiered on VRV on November 8, 2019 and on Blaber's YouTube channel JelloApocalypse on November 22, 2019.

Synopsis
The show takes place in the world of Sweet Jazz City, where one out of five people are born with powers attached to their souls known as "Epithets". An Epithet stems from a single word that can grant its user any kind of power (e.g Soup, Coupon, Sundial). A magical amulet known as the Arsene Amulet is rumored to steal a person's epithet and is hidden somewhere inside the Sweet Jazz Museum. Thieves burst down the doors in the middle of the night, inscribed warriors do battle in abandoned exhibits, dinosaur bones topple to the floor, and a little girl named Molly is trapped in the middle of it all! Will her epithet, "Dumb" be enough to save her? Or will her epithet be erased?

Main characters
 Molly Blyndeff (voiced by Dani Chambers) – Molly is a beleaguered 12-year-old girl who runs a toy emporium in place of her neglectful single father and sister. During a school trip to the Sweet Jazz Museum, she mysteriously becomes tired and falls asleep waking up hours later just in time to see the Banzai Blasters (an amateur villain organization) arrive to steal the amulet. At the beginning of season 1, she is shown to be timid and unable to stand up for herself. Thanks to Giovanni, however, she manages to find herself becoming more assertive and self-caring. Her epithet, "Dumb", allows her to create a soundproof bubble to mute everything around herself inside and out. She can also dumb down pain she or others feel, sometimes using this to dumb down enemies, lowing their intelligence and making them highly suggestible, and can even dumb down summoned objects to nothing.
 Giovanni Potage (voiced by Kyle Igneczi) – Giovanni is a 19-year-old man who was the leader of the group of Banzai Blasters that broke into the museum to steal the Arsene Amulet. He is a very ambitious troublemaker who tries to look cool and menacing (but really comes off as pathetic). Even though he classifies himself as a villain, he has a secret soft side as he is shown to care for each and every one of his minions. When he meets Molly, he guides her into becoming more independent and even has her temporarily join him to take down Indus and Mera. His epithet, "Soup", allows him to make different kinds of soup (although the main one he uses is tomato basil flavor) and use it in different ways, such as turning it into a soup grenade, and using soup steam to propel himself. Also, every 13th attack he makes is stronger than the other ones, mostly because 13 is his lucky number. At the end of season 1, after being humiliated by his fellow Banzai Blasters, he leaves and becomes a solo villain. The creator confirmed in a live stream that Giovanni has two moms, dubbed ‘Giomommy’ and ‘Mamavanni’ by the fanbase.
 Percival "Percy" King (voiced by Sandra Espinoza) – Percy is a young police detective who spearheads the investigation of the theft of the Arsene Amulet. She has a strict moral code as a police officer and values order and safety. As a downside to this, she speaks in a dry monotone with dry humor, often coming off as insensitive and straight-laced, especially to Mundies (people without epithets). Percy is skilled in wielding a, in her words, "real-ass goddamned sword" and is her primary form of attack. Her epithet, "Parapet", allows her to construct small medieval-style buildings with various abilities such as to either heal or injure whoever she is facing (e.g wizard towers that attack the enemy with electricity and apothecaries to heal physical wounds).
 Mera Salamin (voiced by Lindsay Sheppard) – Mera is the main antagonist of the Museum arc. She is a crafty individual who pretended to be a Sweet Jazz Museum employee to get closer to the amulet. She is rather aggressive and seemingly selfish, willing to manipulate others and use dry sarcasm to inflict pain on others. Mera is also quite irresponsible, blaming the whole heist on her bodyguard Indus. Her epithet, "Fragile", allows her to increase the fragility of objects until they shatter. However, this also affects her body to be in constant pain, with her reason for stealing the amulet being to negate the pain of her own epithet with one of others.
 Indus Tarbella (voiced by Anthony Sardinha) – Indus is Mera's loyal bodyguard and sidekick. He joined Mera after she passed through his hometown of Desert Country, challenging him to a duel and easily besting him. After the dual, Indus followed Mera as her new bodyguard to try and learn to become strong like her. He is a gentle giant, with the intelligence of a child and a fondness for dinosaurs. He is also extremely gullible and doesn't quite think about his actions before he does them. His epithet, "Barrier", allows him to produce barriers that vary in size, and can be moved around.
 Dr. Sylvester "Sylvie" Ashling (voiced by Zach Maher) – Sylvie is a 15-year old psychologist who investigates interactions between epithets and the human psyche. During the trip to the museum that Molly's class takes, he overhears Indus talking about the Arsene Amulet and decides to stay behind so he can find and study it. Sylvie is dedicated to research and his job as a psychologist. Isolating himself with his research as a child (with the consequences being he had no friends) Sylvie tends to acts snarky and push others away. He also has a tendency to think he is always right (leading to many arguments) and overthink things. Underneath that persona, he is actually quite caring. His epithet, "Drowsy", allows him to spread a golden dust, making anyone who breathes it in fall asleep and make their dreams come alive. His other abilities include being able to summon a herd nibbling counting sheep, bring people's worst fears to life and to put himself to sleep, bringing his dream self, Dr. Beefton, to life and fight for him
 Ramsey Murdoch (voiced by William Sopp) – Introduced in the Western arc, Ramsey is a rat-faced underworld appraiser and sly con artist who is on the run from bounty hunter Zora. He is good at manipulating people to help reach his goals. Usually (especially when dealing with a customer), Ramsey is laid-backed and calm but when faced with being stuck in a rock and a hard place, he becomes panicky and cowardly. His epithet, "Goldbricker", allows him to transform objects into solid gold and back, including himself.
 Zora Salazar (voiced by Dawn M. Bennett) – Zora is the main antagonist of the Western arc. She was originally sent to take down Ramsey for embezzlement and forgery before Bliss Ocean (another terrorist organisation) designated her to retrieve the Arsene Amulet. She is incredibly malicious and selfish when it comes to achieving her goals, although she claims she doesn't do it that much because it'll become boring for her, is against the spirit of Bliss Ocean, and the fact that she prefers fair duals. Her epithet "Sundial" allows her to make any kind of process move forwards or backwards, including gravity, inertia, the cycle of the sun and even a person's lifespan. She is also a proficient shooter, with guns being her main weapon of choice.

Production
Brendan Blaber began drafting the script for the series as early as Fall 2018 and pitched it to VRV in October of the same year. Official production is estimated to have begun sometime between March and May of 2019, where the series was developed and produced up until the airing of episode 7 on VRV, on December 20, 2019.

The concept of "epithets" were originally introduced in Brendan's Roll20 Tabletop RPG campaign Anime Campaign, and since he liked the concept so much, he decided to carry over many of the elements and characters to Epithet Erased with slight changes.

According to Blaber, Season 1 cost almost a quarter of a million dollars to make, mostly raised from Patreon and by VRV.

A novelized sequel, Epithet Erased: Prison of Plastic, was released as a follow-up to the series on December 9th, 2022. The book was written by Blaber and illustrated by Bo Hello. A follow-up novel, Epithet Erased: Sweet Escape, has been funded, with Blaber intending to continue the series beyond that.

Release and reception
The first episode was released on VRV on 8 November 2019, exclusively in the United States. It was released internationally via YouTube on 22 November 2019, with episodes coming out two weeks after their VRV premiere.

The series has received positive reviews, with many critics praising the concept, characters and writing with some criticism directed towards the limited animation and plot direction.

Merchandise
A plush toy of the show's main character, Molly, was released on May 9, 2020. Produced by the company Makeship, the plush featured Molly's signature bear hoodie, reflector tape backpack and hair marshmallows (non-edible). To produce the doll, Makeship needed about 500 pre-orders, which they reached within 2 days, making sure the doll would be released to the public.

Alongside the announcement of the doll, a soundtrack CD and Season 1 poster were also released, via plasterbrain's Bandcamp and Brendan's Teespring. An advertisement featuring Molly and Giovanni talking about the products was released on the JelloApocalypse YouTube channel.

References

External links
 
 Epithet Erased on YouTube
 Epithet Erased on Reddit
 Epithet Erased on Discord

American children's animated action television series
American children's animated comedy television series
American animated web series
Animated television series about children